The 182nd Battalion (Ontario County), CEF was a unit in the Canadian Expeditionary Force during the First World War.  Based in Whitby, Ontario, the unit began recruiting during the winter of 1915/16 in Ontario County, Ontario.  After sailing to England in May 1917, the battalion was either absorbed into the 18th Reserve Battalion or into the 3rd Canadian Reserve Battalion (Central Ontario).  The 182nd  Battalion (Ontario County), CEF had one Officer Commanding: Lieut-Col. A. A. Cockburn.

The 182nd Battalion (Ontario County), CEF, is perpetuated by The Ontario Regiment (RCAC).

References

Meek, John F. Over the Top! The Canadian Infantry in the First World War. Orangeville, Ont.: The Author, 1971.

Battalions of the Canadian Expeditionary Force
Ontario Regiment